Giuseppe Acerbi (May 3, 1773August 25, 1846) was an Italian naturalist, explorer and composer.

Biography
Giuseppe Acerbi was born on May 3, 1773, in Castel Goffredo, in Lombardy. He was an Italian naturalist, explorer and composer. In 1798, Acerbi traveled to Lapland, publishing his experiences in Travels through Sweden, Finland and Lapland to the North Cape in the years 1798 and 1799 (1802). Some of his works can be found in the New York Society Library in New York, New York. He also written other works along with compositions that became popular.

During his travels, he collected some Finnish folk melodies and religious songs, one of which he used in a Clarinet Concerto.  This was the first Finnish melody to be used in serious music.

In 1836, Acerbi retired from his travels and career. He return to his hometown Castel Goffredo. He began to organizing and administering his notes and collections from his travels. He never completed the task; Giuseppe Acerbi died in his hometown of Castel Goffredo, Italy on August 25, 1846. He was seventy-three years old.

Education 
Giuseppe Acerbi was educated by both his parents at a young age. As he got older, he eventually was taught by a tutor that demanded Acerbi to learn French, German and English as an addition of knowing his native Italian language. He also learned Latin to add to his list of languages. He was taught about classic music, art, and become heavily involved with the sciences. At the age of twenty one, he graduated and received a degree of Law from University at Pavia.

Travels 

Since the start of his travels, the Finnish coast was not what Acerbi expected. From the beginning, Acerbi hated it. He was shocked by the culture of the people and did not enjoy it.
After fighting with other explorers that were part of his trip, Acerbi decided travel through Finnish Lapland by himself on his return of going home. On his way, he recorded hundreds of pages of observations on the Sami people. He wrote notes on the Sami music, language, clothing and the customs. Eventually, he would grow to appreciate the Sami people and culture.

During his stay in Finland he picked up several books of poems, Jos mun tuttuni tulisi ( "If you were my dear"), the lullaby Nuku, nuku nurmilintu ( "Sleep, sleep little bird"), the poem of Antti Keksi about the flood of the river Tornionjoki in 1677, eventually becoming a religious song. He recorded the melody of the song "Do Not Be afraid of the People of Finland" and of Kalevala, the Finnish epic poem, composed of 50 songs, or runi, describing the execution of the poems, the local shaman singers, 

The figure of Acerbi is much more famous in Finland than in Italy: the Finnish radio station's title is derived from its melody. Acerbi returned to Italy for after the publication of his book.

The , an Italian literary award, is named for Acerbi.

Botanical nomenclature

References

1773 births
1846 deaths
People from Castel Goffredo
19th-century Italian writers
Italian naturalists
Italian explorers
Italian travel writers
18th-century travel writers
Italian ornithologists
Italian composers
Italian male composers
Italian expatriates in Finland